Oates may refer to:

People
Oates (surname)
Garfunkel and Oates, comedy act
 Kate Micucci (aka Oates) of "Garfunkel and Oates"
Hall & Oates, musical act

Places and buildings
Oates, Missouri, a community in the United States
Oates Coast, coastal area of Antarctica
Oates Building, historic building in Florida
 Oates, High Laver, Essex, England, the place where John Locke spent his last years

See also
Oats (disambiguation)